Beyries is a commune in the Landes department in Nouvelle-Aquitaine in southwestern France.

Transport

The nearest train station is Orthez station, on the TGV line from Paris to Tarbes. The nearest airport is Pau Pyrénées Airport.

Population

See also
Communes of the Landes department

References

Communes of Landes (department)